Court Street Methodist Church, which for a time also was known as Rock County Appliance and TV, is a historic church at 36 S. Main Street in Janesville, Wisconsin, United States.  It was built in 1868 and was renovated by Masonic organization during 1905–1906.  It was added to the National Register of Historic Places in 1977.

Its NRHP nomination states:The Court Street Methodist Church is one of the most unusual commercial buildings in downtown Janesville. It is significant not only for the quality of its architecture, as the best preserved of two remaining Second Empire commercial buildings in the city, with a fine two-story raised sanctuary, but also for its unique function as a combined commercial and religious building, which represented a Victorian bringing-together of worship and commerce. It was constructed with retail store fronts on the ground story, and the sanctuary on the second and third
floors. This arrangement was not unlike that utilized for the four story Methodist Church Block in Chicago, built on the southeast corner of Clark and Washington Streets in 1872 and razed for a new 21 story edifice in 1923. This Gothic style successor continues the combination arrangement to this day; its sanctuary is perched 20 floors up on top of a small skyscraper, and surmounted by an eight story spire.

References

Churches completed in 1868
Churches in Rock County, Wisconsin
Methodist churches in Wisconsin
Churches on the National Register of Historic Places in Wisconsin
Second Empire architecture in Wisconsin
National Register of Historic Places in Rock County, Wisconsin